Martin Otoničar (born 8 May 1994) is a Slovenian former professional cyclist.

Major results

2011
 National Junior Road Championships
1st  Road race
2nd Time trial
 2nd Trofeo Guido Dorigo
 6th Overall Grand Prix Général Patton
1st Stage 2
2012
 2nd Coppa Pietro Linari
 3rd Overall Tour de la Région de Lódz
1st Stage 3
 4th Paris–Roubaix Juniors
 6th GP Dell'Arno
 7th Piccola San Remo
2014
 1st Banja Luka–Belgrade I
 2nd Central European Tour Košice–Miskolc
 4th Trofej Umag
 8th Banja Luka–Belgrade II
2015
 1st Grand Prix Šenčur
 1st  Points classification Istrian Spring Trophy
 4th GP Slovakia
 5th Time trial, National Road Championships
 8th Gran Premio della Liberazione
2016
 5th Time trial, National Road Championships

References

External links

1994 births
Living people
Slovenian male cyclists
Place of birth missing (living people)